Gorbiscape is a small genus of funnel weavers. It was first described by Alireza Zamani and Yuri M. Marusik in 2020, and it has only been found in Tajikistan.  it contains only two species: G. agelenoides and G. gorbachevi.

See also
 List of Agelenidae species

References

Further reading

Agelenidae genera